"That's the Way Love Is" is a 1962 R&B single by blues singer Bobby Bland.  The single was the last of three entries to hit number one on the US Billboard R&B chart.  "That's the Way Love Is" also made the Top 40. The B-side of "That's the Way Love Is", entitled "Call On Me", was also on the charts at the same time.  The B-side was more successful on the pop singles chart, peaking at number 22, and on the soul singles chart "Call On Me" made it to number six.  Bobby Bland's "That's the Way Love Is" is a different song than the 1969 top ten pop/soul single by Marvin Gaye, ("That's the Way Love Is").

Chart positions

References

1962 singles
Bobby Bland songs
1962 songs
Song articles with missing songwriters